Murături (Romanian for pickles) are vegetables or fruit pickled in brine, with added dill, oak leaves, celery and others for flavoring and preservation, as found in the Romanian cuisine of Romania and Moldova. The pickles are ordinarily made of locally grown produce such as beetroot, cucumber, green tomatoes (Romanian: gogonele), carrots, cabbage, bell peppers, watermelons, mushrooms, turnips, celery and cauliflower.

After fermentation, the pickle juice becomes sour and is sometimes used in soups such as borsch.

See also

Notes and references 

Pickles
Romanian appetizers
Moldovan cuisine